Stefon Bristol is an American film director and screenwriter. He co-wrote and directed the Netflix time travel film, See You Yesterday, in 2019. Bristol studied at New York University's Graduate Film program, under mentor Spike Lee, who helped produce his debut feature. Bristol also acted as an assistant to Lee, while Lee was filming BlacKkKlansman. Bristol originally shot See You Yesterday as a short, for his thesis film, before expanding it into a feature film. It took five years to complete the film.  Bristol received nominations for Best First Feature and Best First Screenplay (with Fredica Bailey) at the 2020 Independent Spirit Awards. Bristol and Bailey won the Independent Spirit Award for Best First Screenplay and thanked Lee in their acceptance speech.

References

External links 
 
 

Living people
Year of birth missing (living people)
Place of birth missing (living people)
American film directors
New York University alumni
Morehouse College alumni